In fluid dynamics, Blasius theorem states that  the force experienced by a two-dimensional fixed body in a steady irrotational flow is given by

and the moment about the origin experienced by the body is given by

 

Here,

 is the force acting on the body, 
 is the density of the fluid,
 is the contour flush around the body,
 is the complex potential ( is the velocity potential,  is the stream function),
 is the complex velocity ( is the velocity vector),
 is the complex variable ( is the position vector),
 is the real part of the complex number, and
 is the moment about the coordinate origin acting on the body.

The first formula is sometimes called Blasius–Chaplygin formula.

The theorem is named after Paul Richard Heinrich Blasius, who derived it in 1911. The Kutta–Joukowski theorem directly follows from this theorem.

References

Fluid dynamics